Zheng Jiachun may refer to:

Henry Cheng (born 1946), Hong Kong businessman
Ili Cheng (born 1993), Taiwanese actress